The Greece national under-17 football team is the Under-17 years of age team of the Greece national football team.

This team is for Greek players aged 17 or under at the start of the UEFA European Under-17 Championship (From 1982 to 2001 it was an Under-16 event).

History

Results and schedule
The following is a list of match results from the previous 12 months, as well as any future matches that have been scheduled.

2022

Euro 2023 Under-17 Championship qualification

2023 UEFA European Under-17 Championship qualification

Group 8

Achievements

UEFA European Under-17 Championship
 UEFA European Under-16 Championship: 1985 – 2nd place
 UEFA European Under-16 Championship: 1991 – 3rd place
 UEFA European Under-16 Championship: 1996 – 4th place
 UEFA European Under-16 Championship: 2000 – 4th place

Players

Current squad
 The following players were called up for the 2023 UEFA European Under-17 Championship qualification.
 Match dates: 5–11 October 2022
 Opposition: ,  and 
Caps and goals correct as of: 8 October 2022, after the match against

Former squads
2019 UEFA European Under-17 Championship squads – Greece
2015 UEFA European Under-17 Championship squads – Greece
2010 UEFA European Under-17 Championship squads – Greece

See also
Greece national football team
Greece national under-23 football team
Greece national under-21 football team
Greece national under-20 football team
Greece national under-19 football team

References

https://en.wikipedia.org/w/index.php?title=Greece_national_under-17_football_team&action=edit

External links
Greece U-17 at HFF 
Greece U-17 at UEFA
UEFA European U-17 Championship at uefa.com

European national under-17 association football teams
under
Youth football in Greece